A period of financial distress occurs when the price of a company or an asset or an index of a set of assets in a market is declining with the danger of a sudden crash of value occurring, either because the company is experiencing increasing problems of cash flow or a deteriorating credit balance or because the price had become too high as a result of a speculative bubble that has now peaked.

Background
It is not known when this phrase was first used or by whom.  However, it or phrases closely equivalent were almost certainly first used in connection with the theory of value investing as developed initially by Benjamin Graham in his famous book  Security Analysis (Graham and Dodd, 1934).  This theory advocated long-term investing in stocks or assets that are underpriced compared to their intrinsic value, that is they have suffered “distress sales” and the stock or asset of company is going through a “period of financial distress.”  If such a period is temporary, and the company can be expected to return to an improved condition of normal solvency, then investing in such an asset can be expected to outperform the stock market in general in the longer run.  In connection with this Graham developed the Benjamin Graham formula, also known as “net current asset value.”  A similar analysis was done by John Burr Williams who developed his discounted cash flow theory (Williams, 1938).  A prominent advocate of Graham and his approach has been Warren Buffett, who has claimed that he is an “85% Graham investor” (Buffett, 2003).

This approach has been criticized by advocates of modern portfolio theory (MPT) and the closely related doctrine of the efficient-market hypothesis (EMH) most closely associated with Eugene Fama (Fama, 1970).  These theories argue that if a stock or asset is selling at what appears to be a “distress value” compared to some estimate of its true value based on its current income flows, then the market has information about the expected future of the company or asset that is not reflected in its current income flow.  In this regard, investors such as Buffett who have successfully used the Graham approach should expect to spend extra resources to have better information about the companies or assets they purchase compared to most agents in the market.  A study that shows that the Graham approach may well do better than various other alternatives (such as the “three-factor theory” that Fama and French, 1996, have argued performs better than the EMH), is Xiao and Arnold (2008).

Use in forecasting corporate bankruptcies
Another use of this phrase has been in connection with efforts to predict corporate bankruptcies that may come out of such a period of financial distress.  One who developed an approach to making such predictions has been Edward Altman, who developed the z-score financial analysis tool (Altman, 1968).  Further study of this and related tools has been done by Altman and Hotchkiss (2005).  This idea can be related to the earlier issue in that presumably why the Graham approach might not do as well as such alternatives as MPT or EMH is that it does not satisfactorily account for the risk of such bankruptcies.  Again, it is clear that to outperform such models a Graham-style investor will have to have sufficiently good information about such possibilities to know whether or not such a threat can be discounted.

Use in analysis of speculative bubbles and crashes
Drawing on these uses from corporate finance, Hyman Minsky applied the phrase to analyzing speculative bubbles and crashes (Minsky, 1972), using it to characterize a period in a speculative bubble that follows a peak in price, in which the price gradually declines, and which is then followed by a crash in which the price falls precipitously.  This analysis was adopted by Charles P. Kindleberger, who in Appendix B of the 4th edition of his book, Manias, Panics, and Crashes (2000) identified 37 out of 47 historical bubbles as exhibiting such a pattern, including most of the more famous ones. Although the phrase was not used, participants in periods of financial distress in early bubbles used a variety of colorful terms and phrases for them, such as "apprehension" or "an ugly drop in the market" during the South Sea bubble in Britain in 1720 (Carswell, 1960, p. 139). Arguably the recent global bubble in financial derivatives exhibited this pattern, with a peak in August 2007, followed by a crash in September 2008.
The first to develop a mathematical model of this period of financial distress was J. Barkley Rosser, Jr. (Chapter 5, 1991), drawing on catastrophe theory, while a more detailed such model using agent-based modeling and relying on the wealth constraint idea due to Minsky has been done by Gallegati, Palestrini, and Rosser (2011.)

References
Benjamin Graham and David Dodd. 1934. Security Analysis: Principles and Technique. New York: McGraw-Hill (sixth edition, 2008).
John Burr Williams. 1938. The Theory of Investment Value. Cambridge: Harvard University Press.
Warren Buffett. 2003. “Preface” to Benjamin Graham and Jason Zweig. 2003. The Intelligent Investor, revised version of 4th edition. New York: Harper-Collins.
Eugene Fama. 1970. “Efficient capital markets: a review of theory and empirical work.” Journal of Finance, 28(2), 383-417.
Eugene Fama and Kenneth French. 1996. “Multifactor explanations of asset pricing anomalies.” Journal of Finance, 51(1), 55-84.
Ying Xiao and Glen C. Arnold. 2008. “Testing Benjamin Graham’s net current value strategy in London.” The Journal of Investing, Winter 17(4).
Edward I. Altman. 1968. “Financial ratios, discriminant analysis and the analysis of corporate bankruptcy.” Journal of Finance, September, pp. 189-209.
Edward I. Altman and Edith Hotchkiss. 2005. Corporate financial distress and bankruptcy: predict and avoid bankruptcy, analyze and invest in distressed debt, 3rd edition. New York: Wiley & Sons.
Hyman P. Minsky. 1972. "Financial instability revisited: the economics of disaster." Reappraisal of the Federal Reserve Discount Mechanism. Washington: Board of Governors of the Federal Reserve System, pp. 95-136.
Charles P. Kindleberger. 2000. Manias, Panics, and Crashes: A History of Financial Crisis, 4th edition. New York: John Wiley & Sons (first edition, 1978, New York: Basic Books).
John Carswell. 1960. The South Sea Bubble. London: Cresset Press.
J. Barkley Rosser, Jr. 1991. From Catastrophe to Chaos: A General Theory of Economic Discontinuities. Boston/Dordrecht: Kluwer Academic Publishers.
Mauro Gallegati, Antonio Palestrini, and J. Barkley Rosser, Jr. 2009. "The period of financial distress in speculative markets: interacting heterogeneous agents and financial conditions," Macroeconomic Dynamics, 2011, vol. 15, no. 1, pp. 60-79.

Bankruptcy
Fundamental analysis
Valuation (finance)